Acheilognathus typus is a species of freshwater ray-finned fish in the genus Acheilognathus.  It is endemic to Japan.

References

Acheilognathus
Fish described in 1863
Freshwater fish of Japan